The Menhir de Champ-Dolent is a menhir, or upright standing stone, located in a field outside the town of Dol-de-Bretagne. It is the second largest standing stone in Brittany and is over 9 meters high.

Location
The Menhir du Champ-Dolent is 2 kilometres (1 mile) south of Dol-de-Bretagne in the department of Ille-et-Vilaine. It is in a small picnic area fenced off among the fields near the D795 road.

Description
The menhir is the second tallest of Brittany's standing stones. Its height above ground is between 9.3 and 9.5 metres (about 31 feet).
100 tonnes. It is oval in shape with a smooth surface. A cross was once placed on top to Christianize it. It is not precisely dated, but recent scholarship suggests that Brittany's menhirs were erected c. 5000–4000 BC.

It has been registered as a monument historique by the French Ministry of Culture since 1889.

In folklore
According to legend, the menhir fell from the skies to separate two feuding brothers who were on the point of killing each other. This legend is said to account for the name "Champ Dolent" which means "Field of Sorrow". In reality, the word dolent is more likely to derive from Breton dolenn ("meadow").

Another legend states that the menhir is slowly sinking into the ground, and the world will end when it disappears altogether.

According to tradition, in the year 560 Chlothar I, King of the Franks, is said to have met his rebel son, Chram, here.

See also
Broken menhir of er grah
Rudston Monolith

References

External links

Megalithic monuments in Brittany
Monuments historiques of Ille-et-Vilaine
Menhirs